Roper Point is a largely ice-covered point, but with some rock exposures, at the west extremity of Mount Takahe, in Marie Byrd Land, it lies 1.5 nautical miles (3 km) west of Cadenazzi Rock. Mapped by United States Geological Survey (USGS) from ground surveys and U.S. Navy air photos, 1959–66. Named by Advisory Committee on Antarctic Names (US-ACAN) for Nathaniel A. Roper, aurora researcher at Byrd Station in 1963.
 

Headlands of Marie Byrd Land